Junoon (Translation: Craze) is a television series produced by Cinevistaas Limited. The series was first broadcast on Doordarshan in 1993. It aired for five years, totaling 510 episodes and setting a record for the longest-running prime time program on Doordarshan. The series revolves around the rivalry between the patriarchs of two well-known families, Rajvansh and Dhanraj, who lead their professional and personal lives with animosity towards each other.

Cast

Main
 Parikshit Sahni as Bharat Kumar Rajvansh/Rai Bahadur Sumer's father (Episode 1 to 7)
 Beena Banerjee as Deepavati Rajvansh, Sumer's paternal mother (Episode 1 to 7)
Ravindra Kapoor as Thakur Diwan and friend of Bharat Kumar Rajvansh (Episode 1 to 7)
Kishori Shahane as Chandni and biological mother of Sumer Rajvansh (Episode 1,2)
Sarita Joshi  as Ranibai, Chandni's Mother (Episode 1 to 3)
 Lalit Mohan Tiwari as Freedom fighter Amar Chakravorty, Rekha's father (Episode 1 to 7)
 Saeed Jaffrey as Baba, Reema's father (Episode 9 to Episode 17)
 Farida Jalal as Gauri, Reema's mother
 Neena Gupta as Reema, Sumer's paternal sister (Episode 9 to Episode 20)
 Mangal Dhillon as Sumer Rajvansh
 Archana Puran Singh as Rekha
Kavin Dave as Vishal Rajvansh, Sumer Rajvansh's son
 Dina Pathak as Savitri Dhanraj, Aditya's grandmother (Episode 1 to 8)
 Vishnu Sharma as Lala Jagdish Prasad, Savitri's relative, Aditya's and Dhanraj's properties caretaker after Brijbhushan's death
 Benjamin Gilani as Brijbhushan Dhanraj, Aditya's Father
 Smita Jaykar as Aditya's mother
Suresh Chatwal as Manmohan Dhanraj, Aditya's uncle
 Shashi Puri as Aditya Dhanraj

Recurring
 Navin Nischol as Justice Rameshwar Bhatnagar, Nalini's father
 Tanuja Samarth as Pratibha Mathur, Justice Bhatnagar's wife, Nalini's mother
Anant Mahadevan as Advocate Vrinal Modi, Pratibha Mathur Friend and Advocate.
 Kiran Juneja as adv. Nalini Mathur, Justice Bhatnagar, and Pratibha's daughter
 Vijayendra Ghatge as adv. Neil Bhatiya, Nalini's colleague, Criminal lawyer Aditya's Lawyer, Mini's ex-husband
Sudha Chopra as Nirmala Bhatiya, Neil's mother
 Shubha Khote as Dr.D'souza (From Episode No 1 to 29)
Dinesh Kaushik as Ketan
 Pankaj Berry as Mr.Agrawal, Mini's father
Shivraj as Ramdas, servant of Mr. Agarwal
 Kitu Gidwani as Mini Agrawal
 Tom Alter as Don Keshav Kalsi/KK/Collector in British Raj
 Sudhir Dalvi as Nana Nagarkar, a crime lord, Sumer's syndicate, and KK's God-father in crime
 Vinod Kapoor as Advocate of Keshav Kalsi and Nana Nagarkar
 Gavin Packard as Masita
 Shagufta Ali as Farheen (Masita's girlfriend)
 Parmeet Sethi as Bobby (KK's stepbrother)
 Deepika Deshpande as Vibha, Bobby lover
 Mohan Gokhale as Jay (KK's stepbrother)
 Kalpana Iyer as Parvati (KK's mother)
 Ajit Vachani as Shergill, Parvati's husband

Other
Virendra Razdan as Mr. Adhikari, Sumer's Solicitor
 Ranjeet as Pathan Sherkhan, Henchman of Saudagar Singh

 Puneet Issar as Saudagar Singh (From episode no 125)
Rama Vij as Wife of Saudagar Singh (Dead), only comes in her dreams.

 Rajesh Khattar as ACP Wajahad Ali, Inspector investigating Seema Dhanraj's murder case, KK's enemy.
 Neelima Azeem as Shabana, Wajahad Ali's wife.

 Ravi Jhankal as Manish Mahajan
Sheela David as Kajri, Manish Mahajan's wife.

 Shiva Rindani as Mukhtyar (From episode no 126)
 Hemant Birje as Ujagar

Chandrashekhar as Justice Habibuddin
Neelam Mehra as Sister Maria of St. Peter Orphanage
Vijay Kashyap as Ramamurthy Iyer, PT teacher of the children boarding hostel
Kunika as Dancer (Only in Episode 124)
Ahmed Khan (actor) as Police Commissioner
Harshada Khanvilkar as Secretary of Sumer Rajvansh

See also
Tiger

References 

DD National original programming
1994 Indian television series debuts
Television shows based on British novels
1999 Indian television series endings